Asfaltovenator (meaning "Cañadón Asfalto Formation hunter" after the fossil formation in which its fossils were found) is a genus of possibly allosauroid dinosaur from the Lower Jurassic Cañadón Asfalto Formation from Chubut Province, Argentina. The type and only species is Asfaltovenator vialidadi.

Discovery 

In 2002, technician Leandro Canesa, roughly a mile north of Cerro Condor, discovered a theropod skeleton. Excavations started in 2005. In 2007, the fossil was in its entirety removed as an enormous stone block, covered by plaster of Paris. It was then prepared by Mariano Caffa, a process that took five years due to the extreme hardness of the stone matrix. Between 2013 and 2015, it was compared with the specimens of related theropods, researchers personally investigating their exemplars in collections all over the world.

In 2019, the type species Asfaltovenator vialidadi was named and described by Oliver Walter Mischa Rauhut and Diego Pol. The generic name combines a reference to the Cañadón Asfalto with a Latin venator, "hunter". The specific name honours  the Dirección Nacional de Vialidad, for assisting the Museo Paleontológico "Egidio Feruglio" in recovering the fossil.

Asfaltovenator is only known from the holotype specimen MPEF PV 3440, which was found in a layer of the Cañadón Asfalto Formation which dates from the late Toarcian to the Bajocian, being latter fully constrained to 179-178 million years (Middle-Late Toarcian) thanks to advanced zircon datation.  It consists of a partial skeleton with skull. It contains the largely complete skull with lower jaws and the front half of the skeleton forward of the hips, including ten neck vertebrae, thirteen back vertebrae and the first sacral vertebra, the complete shoulder girdle minus the furcula and both forelimbs; and also the distal portion of the pubic bones as well as a partial right hindlimb consisting of the distal portion of the femur and proximal portions of the tibia and fibula, and a partial foot.

Description 

The describers indicated a number of distinguishing traits. Some of these are autapomorphies, unique derived characters. The premaxillary teeth have large serrations on the rear edge but only minute serrations on the front edge. The exoccipital bone of the rear skull shows distinctive horizontal ridges between the paraoccipital process and the foramen magnum. On the third and fourth neck vertebrae, the neural spines are triangular and swept backwards. The eleventh and twelfth back vertebrae possess an additional forward ridge on the underside of the diapophysis, the process for the articulation facet of the top rib head.

Classification 
Due to its mosaic of primitive and derived characters within Tetanurae, Asfaltovenator'''s inclusion in the phylogenetic analysis disrupted current views of tetanuran phylogeny, with the analysis recovering Asfaltovenator as a basal allosauroid, above the Piatnitzkysauridae, and traditional Megalosauroidea as a paraphyletic grade leading to Allosauroidea. The unique combination of characteristics seen in Asfaltovenator'' may also indicate megalosauroids and allosauroids shared a common ancestor not shared with the tetanuran group of Coelurosauria.

References 

Carnosaurs
Toarcian life
Bajocian life
Middle Jurassic dinosaurs of South America
Jurassic Argentina
Fossils of Argentina
 
Fossil taxa described in 2019
Cañadón Asfalto Basin